Squeeze Play! is a 1979 American comedy film directed by Lloyd Kaufman.

Plot
A group of New Jersey women, upset over their boyfriends' tendency to pay more attention to softball than their love lives, decide to beat them at their own game...literally. The girls form their own softball team and challenge the men to a match out on the field. The men initially scoff at the idea, but soon grow nervous when they worry that they'll lose face if they refuse to play.

Production
The idea of Squeeze Play! came from a suggestion that Kaufman and Herz should make a movie about a women's softball team and their amorous adventures. Kaufman added the comedy element, and along with his brother Charles and screenwriter Haim Pekelis, a 75-page screenplay was finally worked out; the Kaufmans provided the ideas for sight gags and jokes, and Pekelis worked out the plot.

Reception
Once Squeeze Play! was completed, the reactions were almost unanimously negative. Major studios refused to distribute it, and two of the film's executive producers demanded to have their names taken off of it.

Squeeze Play! finally made its theatrical debut as a double feature with The In-Laws in Norfolk, Virginia to tremendous success. The film built up a steady following in Virginia before being widely distributed nationwide. The film was constantly in Variety’s top 50 list.

Janet Maslin of The New York Times called it "a zesty movie of its kind, though its kind is bound to seem stupid to some and objectionable to others ... the actors are fresh and likable, and at least they don't stand still long enough to wear out their welcome." Variety wrote that the film "does to softball what 'Animal House' and 'Meatballs' did to college and summer camp. But if they rated tastelessness, this battle of the sexes on the diamond would handily outscore the other bawdy pics hands down." Gene Siskel of the Chicago Tribune gave the film zero stars out of four and called it "not much more professional than a home movie." He revealed that he walked out on the film, "which is something I rarely do more than once or twice a year. But when one of the male characters reached into his nose and pulled out some snot and placed it in the beard of a bully, I had enough."

References

External links
 

1979 films
1970s sex comedy films
1970s sports comedy films
American sex comedy films
Films directed by Lloyd Kaufman
Films set in New Jersey
American baseball films
Troma Entertainment films
Teen sex comedy films
1979 comedy films
1970s English-language films
1970s American films